Sultan Muzaffar Shah II (1546–1570) was the second Sultan of Johor. He was known as Raja Muda Perdana before he succeeded the throne. He was installed to the throne of Johor in 1564 by the Acehnese upon the death of his father, Sultan Alauddin Riayat Shah II, who died shortly after he was captured and brought back to Aceh after the Acehnese invasion of Johor.

Muzaffar II moved his capital to Seluyut in 1565 from Johor Lama to assert his independence from the Acehnese. He died in 1570 of poison and was succeeded by Sultan Abdul Jalil Shah I.

Personal life
He had three wives. His first wife was Tun Mas Jiwa, daughter of the temenggung, Tun Hassan. His second wife was Tun Trang, daughter of Tun Ali, Seri Nara Diraja of Pahang, and Tun Fatimah. Tun Trang bore him two sons, Abdul Jalil I and Raja Radin. His third wife was the former wife of Sultan Ali Jalla Abdul Jalil Shah II and daughter of Sultan Husain Ali Riayat Shah of Aceh.

References

Sultans of Johor
1546 births
1570 deaths
Deaths by poisoning